The Galway hooker (Irish: húicéir) is a traditional fishing boat used in Galway Bay off the west coast of Ireland. The hooker was developed for the strong seas there. It is identified by its sharp, clean entry, bluff bow, marked tumblehome and raked transom. Its sail plan consists of a single mast with a main sail and two foresails. Traditionally, the boat is black (being coated in pitch) and the sails are a dark red-brown.

From the late 20th century, there has been a revival of and renewed interest in the Galway hooker, and the boats are still being constructed. The festival of Cruinniú na mBád is held each year, when boats race across Galway Bay from Connemara to Kinvara on the border between County Galway and County Clare.

Classes of Galway hooker 

The hooker refers to four classes of boats. All are named in Irish. The Bád Mór (big boat) ranges in length from 10.5 to 13.5 metres (35 to 44 feet). The smaller Leathbhád (half-boat) is about 10 metres (28 feet) in length. Both the Bád Mór and Leathbhád are decked forward of the mast. These boats were used to carry turf to be used as fuel across Galway Bay from Connemara and County Mayo to the Aran Islands and the Burren. The boats often brought limestone on the return journeys, to neutralise the acid soils of Connemara and Mayo. The Gleoiteog ranges in length from 7 to 9 metres (24 to 28 feet), and has the same sails and rigging as the larger boats. They were used for fishing and carrying cargo. Another boat, the Púcán, is similar in size to the Gleoiteog but has a lug mainsail and a foresail. These smaller boats were entirely open.

There was also a class fitted with a cockpit floor over the ballast used for fishing. When the Irish settlers at Boston in North America needed fishing craft, they built the hooker that they knew from home. These boats became known as 'Boston Hookers', 'Irish Cutters' (in official reports), or 'Paddy Boats'.

While a utilitarian boat, suited for the shallow waters of Galway Bay and being capable of being beached where necessary, the Galway Hooker is prone to being swamped and sinking in a short time in the absence of a cabin and high freeboard. Eighty-two shipwrecks are recorded in the unpublished 'Shipwreck Inventory of Wrecks for Galway Bay'. These wrecks date to between 1750 and 1938; of them, 59 are from the 19th century. No records are known to exist for the period prior to the 18th century. Cargo throughout this period would usually be held in wooden casks varnished with fish oil for waterproofing.

Origins 
The origins of the craft are not clear. A major spark in the revival of interest was the publication in 1983 of The Galway Hookers: Sailing work boats of Galway Bay (Richard J. Scott, d 24/01/08)—now in its fourth edition—in which for the first time detailed construction and sail plans were published.

In popular culture 

 Sean Connery, playing the role of Irishman Michael McBride in Disney's 1959 film Darby O'Gill and the Little People, sings a song about "a pretty Irish girl" that includes the line "crimson sails of Galway Bay, the fishermen unfurl". 
 The Solus operating system has a Galway hooker as its logo.

See also
 Currach
 Seoighe Inish Bearachain

References

External links

 Galway local history site (archived 2005)
 Galway Hooker Association
 James Miles Galway Hooker Collection

Sailing ships
Keelboats
Types of fishing vessels
Fishing in Ireland
Irish design